WE Fest is a three-day country music festival that has been held each year recently on the first weekend in August at the Soo Pass Ranch in Detroit Lakes, Minnesota, United States.

The next WE Fest was scheduled for Aug. 3-5, 2023. 

Ownership of WE Fest (Matt Mithun and Live Nation), has changed in recent years with updates often posted to the website.

The festival was started by Jeff Krueger in August 1983 and was held on a stage that was down in a horse pasture.  The top of the stage was built to look like a barn.  there were approximately 9,000 people. 

An established venue and festival grounds have been developed and on site camping is often an available option.

The WE Fest logo was created by John Roley in 1982 in Bloomington, Minnesota, at Jeff Krueger's attic apartment on Old Shakopee Road. Jeff wanted to call the Festival The US Fest. That logo was actually Steve Wozniak's Festival in California. By suggestion from Roley, Krueger called the festival WE in '83 Festival, then More in '84 and Alive in '85. This is how the WE Fest became a project.
  
Alabama was the first band to perform at WE Fest. Since then, other country singers and bands have included Jason Aldean, Big & Rich, Brooks & Dunn, Kenny Chesney, Carrie Underwood, Eric Church, Florida Georgia Line, Rascal Flatts, Vince Gill, Merle Haggard, Faith Hill, Toby Keith, Jerry Lee Lewis, Roger Miller, Martina McBride, Tim McGraw, Nitty Gritty Dirt Band, Charley Pride, and Kane Brown as well as George Strait, Brett Eldredge, Taylor Swift, Blake Shelton, Tanya Tucker, Keith Urban, Tammy Wynette, Brad Paisley, and Trisha Yearwood.

In 2007, the attendance reached a record high of 83,000 people over the weekend at the themed Heaven in '07 concert. 

In 2016, over 150,000 attended WE Fest.

Lineups By Year

See also
List of country music festivals
Country music

References

External links
 
 WE Fest Information in Detroit Lakes
 The History of WE Fest Documentary produced by Pioneer Public Television
 WE Fest:  Behind the Scenes Documentary produced by Pioneer Public Television

Folk festivals in the United States
Music festivals established in 1983
Country music festivals in the United States
1983 music festivals
Tourist attractions in Becker County, Minnesota
Music festivals in Minnesota